Tianjin FAW Toyota Motor Co., Ltd. (TFTM) is an automobile manufacturing company based in Xiqing District, Tianjin, China. It is a manufacturing and supervising affiliate of the joint venture between Toyota Motor Company and First Automobile Works, and commonly known as FAW Toyota.

Created in 2003, it is an equally owned joint venture with Toyota. As of 2007, it has one passenger vehicle production base in the Xiqing District of Tianjin and two in the Tianjin Economic and Technological Development Zone. As of 2008, it continues to control three production bases and manufactures several Toyota products including the Corolla and Vios. As of 2008, it had an annual production capacity of 470,000.

Subsidiaries

Manufacturing 
 Sichuan FAW Toyota Motor Co., Ltd. (SFTM Chengdu)
 SFTM Changchun Fengyue Co., Ltd. (SFTM Changchun)
 Tianjin FAW Toyota Engine Co., Ltd. (TFTE)
 FAW Toyota (Changchun) Engine Co., Ltd. (FTCE)

Sales 

FAW Toyota Motor Sales Co., Ltd. (FTMS)

Research and development 

 FAW Toyota Research & Development Co., Ltd (FTRD)

Current production

TFTM (Tianjin Plant)

SFTM Chengdu

SFTM Changchun

Current import models

Former production

TFTM (Tianjin Plant)

SFTM Chengdu

SFTM Changchun

Former imported models

See also 
 GAC Toyota

References

External links
 

Car manufacturers of China
Chinese-foreign joint-venture companies
Manufacturing companies based in Tianjin
FAW Group
Toyota factories